

577001–577100 

|-bgcolor=#f2f2f2
| colspan=4 align=center | 
|}

577101–577200 

|-bgcolor=#f2f2f2
| colspan=4 align=center | 
|}

577201–577300 

|-bgcolor=#f2f2f2
| colspan=4 align=center | 
|}

577301–577400 

|-bgcolor=#f2f2f2
| colspan=4 align=center | 
|}

577401–577500 

|-bgcolor=#f2f2f2
| colspan=4 align=center | 
|}

577501–577600 

|-bgcolor=#f2f2f2
| colspan=4 align=center | 
|}

577601–577700 

|-bgcolor=#f2f2f2
| colspan=4 align=center | 
|}

577701–577800 

|-bgcolor=#f2f2f2
| colspan=4 align=center | 
|}

577801–577900 

|-id=881
| 577881 Pálinkáslibor ||  || Libor Pálinkás (born 1965), a Slovak amateur astronomer and observer of deep-sky objects in particular. || 
|}

577901–578000 

|-bgcolor=#f2f2f2
| colspan=4 align=center | 
|}

References 

577001-578000